Shillelagh Trophy can refer to:

 The Jeweled Shillelagh awarded to the victor of the football game between the Notre Dame Fighting Irish and USC Trojans since 1952
 The Shillelagh Trophy (Northwestern–Notre Dame) awarded to the victor of the football game between the Northwestern Wildcats and Notre Dame Fighting Irish 1930–c. 1973
 The Shillelagh Trophy (Notre Dame–Purdue) awarded to the victor of the football game between Notre Dame Fighting Irish and Purdue Boilermakers since 1957